The title Baron FitzAlan has been created either once or twice in the Peerage of England.

1295 creation
The first creation was in 1295, when Bryan FitzAlan, Lord FitzAlan was summoned to Parliament as Lord FitzAlan. On his death in 1306, the peerage fell into abeyance between his two daughters.

1627 Act of Parliament
In 1627 an Act of Parliament was passed “for the annexing of the Castle, &c., of Arundel, with the titles and dignities of the Baronies of FitzAlan, Clun and Oswaldestre and Maltravers, and with divers other lands, &c., being now parcels of the possessions of [him the said] Thomas, Earl of Arundel and Surrey, &c., to the same title, name, and dignity of Earl of Arundel.” "From this period, therefore, the Baronies 
of Clun and Oswestry (or Fitzalan of Clun and Oswestry), which 
hitherto had been mere feudal Lordships, may possibly be considered as 
Peerage dignities, and as being, together with Maltravers, annexed to 
the Earldom of Arundel."  Any Barony so created is held by the Duke of Norfolk.

References

Abeyant baronies in the Peerage of England
Baronies in the Peerage of England
Noble titles created in 1295
Noble titles created in 1627